918 Itha (prov. designation:  or ) is a stony asteroid and the namesake as well as the principal body of the Itha family, located in the outer region of the asteroid belt. It was discovered by German astronomer Karl Reinmuth at the Heidelberg Observatory on 22 August 1919. It was named "Itha", a female name taken from the almanac Lahrer Hinkender Bote, unrelated to the discoverer's contemporaries.

Orbit and classification 

When applying the synthetic hierarchical clustering method (HCM) by Nesvorný, Itha is the principal body and namesake of the Itha family, a small family of stony asteroids with only a few dozen known members. Other larger and low-numbered members of this family include 968 Petunia, 1067 Lunaria, 3787 Aivazovskij, 4119 Miles and 5232 Jordaens. However, according to another HCM-analysis by Milani and Knežević (AstDys), Itha is a background asteroid as it is not a legitimate family in their analysis. It orbits the Sun in the outer asteroid belt at a distance of 2.3–3.4 AU once every 4 years and 10 months (1,770 days; semi-major axis of 2.86 AU). Its orbit has an eccentricity of 0.19 and an inclination of 12° with respect to the ecliptic. The body's observation arc begins at Heidelberg Observatory on 23 August 1919, the night after its official discovery observation.

Naming 

This minor planet was named "Itha", picked from the Lahrer Hinkender Bote, an almanac which was published in Lahr, southern Germany. Especially in the alemannic-speaking region, a Hinkender Bote (lit. "limping messenger") was very popular from the late 17th throughout the early 20th century. The calendar section contains feast days, the dates of important fairs and astronomical ephemerides. For 15 January, the calendar gives "Itha" as the German name day analogue next to Maurus and Habakuk, the protestant and catholic entries in the calendar of saints, likely referring to Saint Maurus and prophet Habakkuk.

Reinmuth's calendar names 

As with 22 other asteroids – starting with 913 Otila, and ending with 1144 Oda – Reinmuth selected names from this calendar due to his many asteroid discoveries that he had trouble thinking of proper names. These names are not related to the discoverer's contemporaries. Lutz Schmadel, the author of the Dictionary of Minor Planet Names learned about Reinmuth's source of inspiration from private communications with Dutch astronomer Ingrid van Houten-Groeneveld, who worked as a young astronomer at Heidelberg.

Physical characteristics 

Itha is an S-type asteroid in the SMASS-I classification by Xu (1995). This agrees with the overall spectral type for members of the Itha family.

Rotation period 

In June 2011, a rotational lightcurve of Itha was obtained from photometric observations by Julian Oey at Kingsgrove Observatory , Australia, in collaboration with three Argentinian astronomers. Lightcurve analysis gave a well-defined rotation period of  hours with a brightness variation of  magnitude. The modelling of the former gave two poles at (59.0°, −59.0°) and (249.0°, −72.0°), while the one of the latter gave only one pole at (72.0°, −54.0°) in ecliptic coordinates (λ, β).

Diameter and albedo 

The Collaborative Asteroid Lightcurve Link derives an albedo of 0.2412 and a diameter of 20.53 km based on an absolute magnitude of 10.6.

References

External links 
 Lightcurve Database Query (LCDB), at www.minorplanet.info
 Dictionary of Minor Planet Names, Google books
 Discovery Circumstances: Numbered Minor Planets (1)-(5000) – Minor Planet Center
 
 

000918
Discoveries by Karl Wilhelm Reinmuth
Named minor planets
19190822